Mobile Literacy in South Africa refers to a range of informal education projects and initiatives that support the development of literacy and enable digital fluency while using mobile devices, especially mobile phones. Mobile literacy is also known by the abbreviation mLiteracy.

The mobile Literacy ecosystem in South Africa was mapped at the mLiteracy Network Meeting hosted by the Goethe-Institut Johannesburg in January 2015. The starting point for meeting was the UNESCO study "Reading in the Mobile Era" (2014), which takes a closer look at the implications of reading on mobile devices in developing countries.

Ecosystem of mLiteracy in South Africa 

The mobile Literacy ecosystem in South Africa has developed organically through the work of several stakeholders who use mobile platforms to encourage access to text, stories and reading materials. Role players within this ecosystem include content providers, platforms, mobile networks, funding agencies, training facilities (including schools and libraries), authors and users. Several organisations working within or based in South Africa have links to and synergies with projects across Africa. Most of the projects use open licences, specifically Creative Commons licences.

Historically, the target group of most projects has been children, teenagers and young adults. Recent data from the South African Department for Basic Education showed that 53% of all Grade 3 children and 70% of all Grade 6 children scored less than 35% on the Annual National Assessment language test. With high mobile penetration in South Africa (some claims as high as 128%) there is potential to engage with learners and young adults at every stage of their development via mobile devices.

Content providers 
African Storybook. Founded in 2013, the African Storybook has published numerous openly licensed illustrated children's stories for 2- to 10-year-olds in a variety of African languages and English. The site has tools for the creation, translation and adaptation of stories. The project, an initiative of the South African Institute for Distance Education (SAIDE) (an NGO based in Johannesburg), is funded by the UK organisation Comic Relief. The African Storybook publishes stories in over 40 different African languages.
Book Dash. Founded in 2014, Book Dash creates new, African storybooks for young children, published under a creative commons attribution licence. Their sponsors and partners include the Central Library Cape Town, The African Storybook, Rock Girl and many others. On Book Dash Days, volunteer writers, illustrators and designers work together to create complete books in just one day. These are then made available as print-ready and mobile-ready files.
Bookly, founded in 2011 by Cover2Cover Books was launched in 2013 by NATIVE VML. It encourages teenagers to read some of the 450 stories available via the Mxit platform (now defunct) and write their own short stories.
FunDza aims to encourage teenagers to read for pleasure. The FunDza Literacy Trust was. As of January 2015, 50,000 teenagers were reading FunDza stories via their mobile phone every month. Additionally, readers are encouraged to comment on what they read, and to write their own stories. FunDza publishes stories in all of the eleven official languages of South Africa.
Nal'ibali. Primarily aimed at adults, Nal'ibali provides stories parents can read to their children. It was funded by The Project for the Study of Alternative Education in South Africa, Times Media, and the DG Murray Trust in 2012 and focuses on "reading for pleasure". Nal'ibali publishes stories in all of the eleven official languages of South Africa.
Penreach has initiated the Asifundze Programme in Ehlanzeni (Mpumalanga), focused on improving literacy and numeracy among young children between the ages of 5 and 9. This programme targets a broad stakeholder group including; teachers, parents, community groups and district officials. It specifically has the aim of:
Improving Home Language, English Language and basic numeracy skills among young children in disadvantaged communities in Mpumalanga;
Rapidly increasing the availability and use of reading materials in poor communities;
Rapidly increasing community involvement in literacy development and establishing a culture of reading in poor communities in Mpumalanga.
Worldreader was founded in 2010 by Coleen McElwee and David Risher, the former Senior Vice President for Amazon's US Retails. Worldreader makes commercial e-books available in developing countries at largely discounted prices. It is accessible in 50 countries,10 of which are in Sub-Saharan Africa. Since the launch of the project Worldreader has made 15,519 books available via mobile phones.
Yoza Cellphone Stories was launched in 2009 as a Shuttleworth Foundation project led by Steve Vosloo. The project provides a number of stories accessible on basic mobile phones. Due to lack of funding Yoza is not an active project anymore, but their stories can still be accessed via their website. Yoza published stories in English and isiXhosa.
Puku Children's Literature Foundation is a reading promotion and book curation organisation that aims to ensure that all children have access to quality, culturally relevant literature in all South African languages. One of Puku’s primary vehicles for promoting this is the creation of an engaging and innovative digital encyclopedia that houses and reviews literature and bodies of work for what will be South Africa’s first comprehensive database of children’s literature (Pukupedia) and which promotes the buying and reading of books that affirm the African child.

Contribution and licence activators 
Creative Commons South Africa provides a pool of copyright licenses in order to simplify sharing creative works and enabling universal access to knowledge. Some of the above-mentioned projects work under a CC license.
WikiAfrica is an initiative which aims at encouraging the transfer and development of African content onto Wikipedia. They are training people, groups and organisations to contribute or donate African knowledge to Wikipedia and improve the current lack of presence of voices from Africa.
Wikipedia Zero is an initiative that grants access to Wikipedia without any airtime costs. In South Africa there is a limited version of Wikipedia Zero available to users of the MTN network.

Library-based projects 
The Johannesburg City Library has launched some initiatives supporting eLearning and promoting techno-literacy.
The Library and Information Association of South Africa (LIASA), launched in 1997, aims at building capacity for libraries, expanding access to content and providing a platform for libraries and librarians.
The Ulwazi Programme, established in 2008 by the eThekwini Municipality’s Libraries and Heritage Department, Ulwazi was the first project by a library in South African to collect and share knowledge about local culture and history. The project encouraged local communities to participate in sharing local knowledge online and increase internet use in Africa.

Research into mobile literacy 
Researching Mobile Media at the University of Cape Town
Researchers at the University of Cape Town have conducted a number of research projects exploring mobile literacy. These include studies of digital literacy and the relationship between mobile literacies and multilingualism.  Projects have highlighted the important role of public access spaces such as libraries and cybercafes in supporting mobile literacies. This builds on research in the Centre for ICT4D at the University of Cape Town, which explores how technical innovations can support sharing media on mobile devices and which describes the nature of mobile-first digital literacy practices.

International affiliated organisations 
Electronic Information for Libraries (EIFL) in Africa, conducts programmes in Ethiopia, Ghana, Kenya and South Africa that focus on training in Information and Communication for librarians.
Goethe-Institut Johannesburg: The Goethe-Institut is the Federal Republic of Germany’s cultural institute, active worldwide. It promotes the study of German abroad and encourages international cultural exchange. Since the implementation of a new digital strategy in the year 2014, a strong focus lies on initiating an international dialogue about the implications, challenges and possibilities of digital developments in education, culture and society.
Kenya National Library Service: Kisumu & Kibera project. National Library Service of Kenya  (KNLS) develops, promotes, establishes and equips libraries in Kenya. Their mission is to enable access to information and knowledge to promote literacy in Kenya.
German Library Association: compared to South Africa, mobile phones do not play a very significant role in Germany, but they are becoming more important in Germany as well. The GLA has launched the "Reading is strength" project which aims at improving digital and new media competence.
Mobiliteracy Uganda: supported by the United States Agency for International Development promotes literacy by sending messages containing reading lessons to an adult's phone they can share with their children. Alternatively, additional audio files are used in order to enable illiterate parents to participate in the project.
Sen Mobile: launched in Senegal, Sen Mobile provides Mobile Development, SMS Service, Quality Assurance and Quality & Training. Their main focus is mobile learning, health and entertainment.

Developments and challenges 
Since the implementation of the first projects in the year 2009, the mLiteracy landscape in South Africa has undergone some promising developments:

The number of feature and smart phones is rising significantly.
More and more mLiteracy projects for formal and informal learning have been established (see above)
The importance of training educators and parents in the field of the educational potential of mobile phones is growing.
Access to literature and literacy projects via mobile phone serves the form of communication young people are accustomed to.
The number of relevant content (for example e-books) is growing. (partly provided by the above projects).

On the other hand, there are still a number of major challenges:
The lack of Africa-relevant content and content in African languages remains a major problem.
The costs of airtime to access information via mobile phones can in many cases be a threshold, the majority of users (96%) access the internet on their mobile phone via prepaid, which is more expensive than network contracts.
Most of the projects that make content available for free rely on funding from NGOs and are therefore often not sustainable.
Parents, educators and librarians are not aware enough about the opportunities the access to information via mobile phone offers.
Gender equality is also a problem when it come to access to mobile phones. The UNESCO study "Reading in the mobile era" shows that there are by far more male mobile readers than female. But once women gain access, they tend to read six times longer than men. The study also showed, that 2/3 of the women read stories, which they access via their phones, to their children. Making mobile devices accessible for women, will also increase childhood literacy.

See also
 Digital divide in South Africa
 Internet in South Africa
 Media of South Africa
 Telecommunications in South Africa

References

Literature 

Reading in the mobile era (UNESCO, 2014) (Retrieved 8.2.2015)
UNESCO policy guidelines for mobile learning (2013) (Retrieved 8.2.2015)
The Future of Mobile Learning: implications for policy makers and planners (UNESCO, 2013) (Retrieved 8.2.2015)
Turning on Mobile Learning in Africa and the Middle East: illustrative initiatives and policy implications (UNESCO 2012) (Retrieved 8.2.2015)
 Walton, Marion: Mobile Literacy & South African Teens: Leisure reading, writing, and MXit chatting for teens in Langa and Guguletu (December 2009) (Retrieved 2.8.2015) 
 Mobile for Reading: A landscape research review (June, 2014) (Retrieved 8.2.2015)
Walton, M., & Donner, J. Public access, private mobile: The interplay of shared access and the mobile Internet for teenagers in Cape Town. Global Impact Study Research Report Series., 1–69. (2012). (Retrieved 2.8.2015)

Telecommunications in South Africa
Literacy
Mobile web
Education in South Africa